T. J. Roberts (born Ted Jan Roberts September 24, 1979) is an American actor, martial artist, stuntman, and producer.

Career 
Roberts played the lead roles in martial arts films such as Magic Kid (with Don "The Dragon" Wilson playing himself) and its sequel Magic Kid II, in Tiger Heart, "A Dangerous Place," and The Power Within. He also appeared in adventure/drama film Hollywood Safari and the live-action TV series Masked Rider, based on the character created by Shotaro Ishinomori and as a series made by Toei Company, produced by Saban Entertainment.

He played LGBT activist Dennis Peron in Milk (2008).

Filmography

Film

Television

References

External links
 

1979 births
Living people
American male child actors
American martial artists
American stunt performers